Old World flycatchers is the common name for the avian family Muscicapidae, which also includes the Old World chats. The International Ornithological Committee (IOC) recognizes these 352 species in the family, distributed among five subfamilies and 51 genera.

This list is presented according to the IOC taxonomic sequence and can also be sorted alphabetically by common name and binomial.

References

Muscicapidae
Old World flycatcher